George Cowles may refer to:

 George W. Cowles (1823–1901), U.S. Representative from New York
 George A. Cowles (1836–1887), ranching pioneer in San Diego, California
 George Cowles (soldier) (1780–1860), representative in the Connecticut General Assembly
 George R. Cowles, member of the Connecticut House of representatives from Norwalk